Cameron Rayner (born 21 October 1999) is a professional Australian rules footballer playing for the Brisbane Lions in the Australian Football League (AFL). He was drafted by Brisbane with the first overall selection in the 2017 national draft.

Career

2018 season 

In round 4, on what was a horror day for the Lions, Rayner was a shining light for the Lions, recording a career-best 22 disposals and kicking his side's second of 2 goals for the day in a 93-point loss against reigning premiers  at the MCG. In the following round in the QClash against , Rayner had a chance to draw the match right on the full-time siren, but he pulled his kick wide to the left for a behind and the Lions were defeated by 5 points.

Rayner had a chance to win the game against  in round 20 after being awarded a free kick on a slight angle 30m from goal, but he attempted a kick around the body and his shot went wide to the right for a behind. The Lions lost by 3 points.

2020 season 
On November 5 2020, Rayner signed a three-year extension with Brisbane, contracting him until the end of 2023.

Statistics
Updated to the end of the 2022 season.

|-
| 2018 ||  || 16
| 22 || 20 || 14 || 149 || 148 || 297 || 76 || 52 || 0.9 || 0.6 || 6.8 || 6.7 || 13.5 || 3.5 || 2.4 || 3
|-
| 2019 ||  || 16
| 24 || 20 || 25 || 139 || 90 || 229 || 59 || 52 || 0.8 || 1.0 || 5.8 || 3.8 || 9.5 || 2.5 || 2.2 || 0
|-
| 2020 ||  || 16
| 17 || 17 || 7 || 85 || 82 || 167 || 51 || 54 || 1.0 || 0.4 || 5.0 || 4.8 || 9.8 || 3.0 || 3.2 || 2
|-
| 2021 ||  || 16
| 0 || – || – || – || – || – || – || – || – || – || – || – || – || – || – || –
|-
| 2022 ||  || 16
| 24 || 24 || 21 || 211 || 142 || 353 || 76 || 56 || 1.0 || 0.9 || 8.8 || 5.9 || 14.7 || 3.2 || 2.3 || 4
|- class=sortbottom
! colspan=3 | Career
! 87 !! 81 !! 67 !! 584 !! 462 !! 1046 !! 262 !! 214 !! 0.9 !! 0.8 !! 6.7 !! 5.3 !! 12.0 !! 3.0 !! 2.5 !! 9
|}

Notes

Honours and achievements
Individual
 AFL Rising Star nominee: 2018 (round 15)

Early life 
Rayner attended Taylors Lakes Secondary College and Penleigh and Essendon Grammar School prior to being drafted.

References

External links

1999 births
Living people
Brisbane Lions players
Western Jets players
Australian rules footballers from Victoria (Australia)
People educated at Penleigh and Essendon Grammar School